Lonquimay is a town and commune in the Malleco Province of southern Chile's Araucanía Region.

Transport 
It is the terminus of an abandoned  broad gauge railway project which supporters cited as the most practical railway route through the Andes to Argentina, but which lacks a link between Lonquimay and Zapala in Argentina; revival of the project was announced in 2005 and progress begun within Chile.

Demographics
Of these, 3,435 (33.6%) lived in urban areas and 6,802 (66.4%) in rural areas. The population grew by 12.5% (1,138 persons) between the 1992 and 2002 censuses.

Administration
As a commune, Lonquimay is a third-level administrative division of Chile administered by a municipal council, headed by an alcalde who is directly elected every four years. The 2008-2012 alcalde is Guillermo Vásquez Veroiza (PPD).

Within the electoral divisions of Chile, Lonquimay is represented in the Chamber of Deputies by Enrique Estay (UDI) and Fuad Chahín (PDC) as part of the 49th electoral district, together with Victoria, Curacautín, Melipeuco, Vilcún, Lautaro, Perquenco and Galvarino. The commune is represented in the Senate by Alberto Espina Otero (RN) and Jaime Quintana Leal (PPD) as part of the 14th senatorial constituency (Araucanía-North).

Geography

Climate 

Summers have warm days and chilly to cool nights. Winters are chilly and wetter, with the possibility of snowfall. This climate favors winter sports, and at the foot of the Lonquimay is The Corralco Mountain and Ski Resort. This climate is described by the Köppen climate classification as Cfb.

See also 
 Icalma Lake
 Galletué Lake
 Trans-Andean Railways

References 

 Tramz

External links 
  Municipality of Lonquimay

19th-century fortifications in Chile
Communes of Chile
Populated places in Malleco Province
Plateaus of the Andes
Plateaus of Chile